The Arrival Bus is an upcoming low-floor single-decker electric bus produced by British electric vehicle manufacturer Arrival. The first prototypes were constructed and entered beta testing in 2020, with the first Arrival Bus being publicly revealed in November 2021. Testing of prototypes remains ongoing, with entry into production expected by the end of 2022. A letter of intent has been signed with Ember as the planned launch customer for the Arrival Bus, and further early production vehicles will be tested across the United Kingdom by FirstGroup.

The Arrival Bus will be offered in two main models: the  Arrival Bus B10 and the  Arrival Bus B12, the latter with up to 36 passenger seats. Both models will be offered to customers in Europe and North America, with European production taking place at the main Arrival facility in Bicester in Oxfordshire, while North American production will be based at the Arrival microfactory in Rock Hill, South Carolina. 

Arrival intends to sell the all-electric Arrival Bus for around the same price as a conventional diesel bus, and the bodywork is made from plastic composites rather than aluminium or steel in order to reduce production costs as well as each vehicle's overall weight. Unlike many competitors, the battery packs in the Arrival Bus are fitted underneath the floor rather than on the roof, providing a lower centre of gravity and allowing for a full-length skylight in the ceiling to provide a brighter interior space for travelling passengers.

The Arrival Bus achieved European Union safety certification in May 2022, clearing the way for series production to commence.

In August 2022, Arrival paused development of its bus and car projects, postponing trials of the bus with FirstGroup.

References 

Single-deck buses
Low-floor buses
Electric buses
Vehicles introduced in 2020
Arrival (company)